Frank Vandenbroucke (6 November 1974 – 12 October 2009) was a Belgian professional road racing cyclist. After showing promise in track and field in his adolescence, Vandenbroucke took to cycle racing in the late 1980s and developed into one of the great hopes for Belgian cycling in the 1990s, with a string of victories that included Liege-Baston-Liege, Grand Tour stages and Omloop Het Volk. This early success dissipated however in a series of drug problems, rows with teams and suicide attempts. Despite repeated attempts to continue his career with a string of different teams from 2000 to 2008, Vandenbroucke's drug use and unpredictability eventually led to his estrangement from the cycling world. Although Vandenbroucke claimed in an interview in 2009 to have recovered his mental health, he died of a pulmonary embolism in October 2009 at the age of 34.

Background
Frank Vandenbroucke was born in Mouscron and grew up in Ploegsteert, a village in the French-speaking region of Belgium (with facilities for Dutch speakers). In 1978, when he was four and cycling in the village square, he was knocked over by the driver of a rally car. His mother said her son didn't cry until doctors cut his cycling shorts. The collision led to four operations on his right knee and repeated problems later in life.

Vandenbroucke first tried athletics, joining the Entente Athlétique Hainaut. In 1986 he became a regional schoolboy champion. He took out a cycling licence with the club in 1989 and won a race at Brakel. An unnamed acquaintance told the Belgian journalist Philippe van Holle:

In 1991, when he was 17, Vandenbroucke won the national beginners [débutant] road championship at Halanzy. He came third in the world junior road championship in Athens in 1992.

Career
Vandenbroucke turned professional in 1993 with the Belgian team, . The directeur sportif was his uncle, Jean-Luc.  He won 51 races in the next six years, including the 1999 Liège–Bastogne–Liège. From 2000 he made the sports pages more for doping problems, failed comebacks, depression, marital problems and a suicide attempt.

Vandenbroucke left Lotto in the middle of 1995 to join . There he became a team-mate of Johan Museeuw. The manager was Patrick Lefevere. In 1997, the team picked him as part of their squad for the Tour de France. In what would be his first of just two Tour de France entries, Vandenbroucke came close to winning a stage twice. On stage 3, he led the peloton up a steep sprint finish, but was overtaken by Erik Zabel right before the line. He was second again on stage 16, this time unable to match the sprint of Christophe Mengin. In 1998 he won Gent–Wevelgem, two stages and the overall competition of Paris–Nice, and two stages of the Tour de Wallonie.

In 1999 he transferred to the French team  where, at only 24, he had the best year of his career. He won Liège–Bastogne–Liège, Omloop Het Volk, and stages in Paris–Nice and the Vuelta a España. His win in Liège–Bastogne–Liège was all the more impressive because he had said in television interviews prior to the race where and when he would attack, stating he would make his first move on Cote de la Redoute, and even going as far as giving the number of the house in front of which he would launch his second attack on the climb of Saint-Nicolas.

It was, however, his last year of major victories. The British magazine Procycling said:

At Cofidis he shared leadership with David Millar.  His "non-communication" with Millar was publicised and criticised.  It was with Cofidis, Vandenbroucke said in his autobiography, that he met the French rider, Philippe Gaumont. It was Gaumont's confessions of drug-taking in the team that led to the so-called Cofidis scandal that included a raid by drugs police on Millar's house and the British rider's suspension for two years and his disqualification from the world time-trial championship he had won. Gaumont, Vandenbroucke said in his life story, suggested he take a drug trip by mixing Stilnoct, a sleeping aid, with alcohol. Gaumont described Vandenbroucke as a wild man of cycling. It was Gaumont, Vandenbroucke said, who introduced him to Bernard Sainz, with whom his name would be connected in alleged drugs scandals (see below).

In 2001 he moved to the Italian team, then to the Belgian team, Domo–Farm Frites, the following year, rejoining Lefevère and Museeuw. Vandenbroucke stayed with Lefevère when he started the Quick-Step–Davitamon team in 2003 and he came second to Peter van Petegem in the Tour of Flanders. Vandenbroucke said he was happy with his performance, that he had attacked van Petegem on the last climbs because he knew van Petegem would beat him in the sprint, but Lefevère criticised him for lack of effort and Vandenbroucke left the team.

In 2004 he joined the Italian team, under Giancarlo Ferretti. He asked not to be paid unless he won. He had a largely empty season and was fired. He joined Mr Bookmaker for 2005. He missed so many races that the team director, Hilaire Van der Schueren, demanded Vandenbroucke demonstrate that he was still a racing cyclist. In two seasons at the team, he managed just one minor result, ninth on the time trial of the 2006 Three Days of de Panne. Eventually, he was sacked for not staying in touch. In 2008, he signed with Mitsubishi, where he was suspended when accused by Belgian police of buying cocaine in Wielsbeke.

On 4 April 2009 he won a stage in the French race La Boucle de l'Artois, on a 15 km time trial, his first win in a UCI-race since 1999.

Vandenbroucke said in 2004: "I've never done anything to make myself popular. In fact, the opposite. Sometimes I think it's all a dream. I've thrown up a marriage, I've been on bad terms with my parents for a long time, all of which has troubled and exhausted me." He said he had disappointed sponsors, managers and directeurs sportifs, even though they continued to show confidence in him. "I had become schizophrenic", he said. Without psychiatric help, he would "have followed the same path as Pantani", the Italian rider found dead on a hotel floor. After 450,000 French francs a month at Cofidis, he earned 220,000 at Lampre in 2001 and then half that at Fasso Bortolo.

Family problems
Vandenbroucke had a daughter (Cameron) with his partner Clotilde Menu in February 1999, but the couple never were married and soon separated. The following year, Vandenbroucke wed Sarah Pinacci, a former model and hostess with the Italian team, Saeco. They lived at Lebbeke, near Brussels.

Vandenbroucke and Pinacci had a turbulent relationship, and it was said in the media that they could not live together and they could not live apart – forming what those close to them called "a diabolical couple". In December 2001, they had a daughter (Margaux).

In July 2006, VDB fired a gun into the air while arguing with his wife, who later left him. Vandenbroucke's father, Jean-Jacques, said his son had tried to frighten his wife that he had committed suicide. His father said:

Vandenbroucke and Pinacci eventually divorced, and the Belgian struggled to establish a more tranquil, less-public life. He resided for a time with a couple in Eeklo who had taken him in after earlier rows with his wife, before moving-on to stay with other friends. His parents, who run a bar and his supporters' club in Ploegsteert – membership dropped from 300 to 145 between 2005 and 2006 although 600 bought "Franky is for ever" T-shirts – said in 2006 that they had heard little from their son since he left Belgium for Italy. His wife had visited twice, to present her husband's new clothing collection, but not to see Vandenbroucke. In 2005, he and his estranged wife and their daughter had a weekend at Eurodisney in Paris. Supporters in the Frankyboys fan club at the café 't Parkske in Oudenaarde said Vandenbroucke had never been to see them, "although he said a couple of times that he would come but then never did." The chairman of the Frankyboys, Adelin de Meulemeester, said: "You can see him one day and he'll give you a friendly hello, then the next he won't even notice you [ziet hij je niet staan]."

In 2006 he asked his agent to ask his parents to sell his house in Nieuwkerke, near Ypres.

Vandenbroucke and his uncle, Jean-Luc, did not speak for two years after Vandenbroucke broke his contract in leaving Lotto, the team which Jean-Luc Vandenbroucke managed.

Drug problems
Vandenbroucke made headlines in 1999 for the first of many drug problems, arrested by Paris police but then released. In 2001 he was stopped on the E17 motorway in Belgium in a speeding car shared with Bernard Sainz, the so-called Dr Mabuse of cycling. Sainz was jailed in 2008 for falsely practising medicine. Sainz could not produce the insurance documents the law insisted he carry and police searched the car and found drugs later identified as clenbuterol, morphine and EPO, which is used in sport as a blood-booster. Sainz insisted they were homeopathic products. After Sainz said he had spent the night at Vandenbroucke's house, police acquired a search warrant from a court in Termonde and searched Vandenbroucke's house with drugs specialists. There they found small quantities of more drugs which Vandenbroucke claimed were for his dog. Vandenbroucke was handcuffed and taken to a police station. Two and a half thousand fans signed a petition complaining about his treatment. Among them was his rival, Peter van Petegem. Vandenbroucke was banned by the Flemish cycling federation from riding in Belgium for six months.

The police said he was "very evasive" during questioning. The inquiries continued and in December 2004 Vandenbroucke admitted taking growth hormones, EPO, amphetamine, morphine and steroids, although he did not name his suppliers. He was found guilty in 2005 and sentenced to 200 hours of community service. He appealed and a court in Ghent fined him 250,000 euros instead. The Belgian press agency, Belga, said the court considered a fine suited to "the type of crime and Vandenbroucke's personality."

Vandenbroucke said he was naive but not dishonest in using Sainz – who was not charged – but that he was impressed at his results. He said at a news conference in Ploegsteert that he had always thought Sainz gave him homeopathic products but that he had doubts. He said Sainz had given him drops and injections. He said:

He paid Sainz 7,000 French francs for the homeopathic drops and 50,000 in fees in the first half of 1999. Sainz said:

Vandenbroucke was twice stopped by police in 2002 for driving his Porsche after drinking.

In February 2007, publicity for Vandenbroucke's autobiography, Je ne suis pas Dieu [I'm Not God] said he admitted taking performance-enhancing drugs.

The publisher later denied Vandenbroucke had said it, claiming a misunderstanding. Vandenbroucke did, however, write that he lived a life of drug-taking and sometimes didn't sleep for days. He said:

In March, the Union Cycliste Internationale declared Vandenbroucke persona non grata. His ex-wife described him as a cocaine addict.  Vandenbroucke was suspended by Mitsubishi–Jartazi and then left.

Impersonation
In August 2006, Vandenbroucke was caught in an Italian amateur race at Inverno, run by an organisation not associated with the Italian federation or Olympic committee, using a licence made out to "Francesco del Ponte" and bearing a photo of the world champion, Tom Boonen. He described himself as Swiss and living in Rome, giving the address of a beauty salon.

Vandenbroucke said riding had been "a weakness". He said: "I dropped out of the race. I have never crossed the line in amateur races and I have never wanted to falsify their races." He rode because he "needed races", he said, at a time when he felt strong. He denied sticking Boonen's picture on his licence, saying he would have chosen someone else's picture.

Suicide attempt
Vandenbroucke had a reputation for "accidents, illnesses, doping allegations, lawsuits, suspicion, surliness and suspensions". He said:

On 6 June 2007 he was admitted to hospital at Magenta, near Milan, Italy, where he lived. He was reported in grave condition. His team-manager, Palmiro Masciarelli, said: "Frank is all alone". He no longer has his wife and he lives by himself. There is no longer a team at his side."

Vandenbroucke had turned down the Giro d'Italia, claiming problems with his knee, on which he had an operation the previous winter. His psychiatrist, Jef Brouwers, said

Death
Vandenbroucke died on 12 October 2009, while on holiday at Saly, a coastal resort 70 km south of Dakar, the capital of Senegal. He planned to stay there 12 days with a former teammate, Fabio Polazzi.  An autopsy in Senegal showed he had died of a pulmonary embolism. The circumstances remain unclear due to conflicting reports, some saying a combination of drugs was found by his bedside.

An employee at La Maison Bleue, his hotel, was quoted by Agence France-Presse: "When he came in [at 2 AM], he was drunk. He was with a Senegalese woman and he planned to stay one night. At 4 AM his companion came to ask for a mop because he had been sick. By 1 PM he had not left his room. Around 8 PM my boss called me and told me he was dead."

Three people who allegedly stole his personal possessions on the night of his death were arrested, including a woman who had spent the evening with him. On 18 November 2009 his family said it did not want further tests to determine if he was under the influence of drugs.

Major results

1992 
 1st  Road race, National Junior Road Championships
 3rd  Road race, UCI Junior Road World Championships
1993
 1st Seraing-Aachen-Seraing
1994
 2nd Druivenkoers Overijse
 2nd Prueba Villafranca de Ordizia
 3rd Tour de Berne
 3rd Clásica de Sabiñánigo
 4th Trofeo Laigueglia
 4th Cholet-Pays de la Loire
 5th Grand Prix de Rennes
 6th Overall Tour Méditerranéen
1st Stage 6
 7th Veenendaal–Veenendaal
 8th Grand Prix de Wallonie
 9th Overall Route du Sud
 9th Overall Four Days of Dunkirk
1995
 1st Paris–Brussels
 1st Cholet-Pays de Loire
 1st Stage 1 Tour de Luxembourg
 2nd Grand Prix de Fourmies
 3rd Prueba Villafranca de Ordizia
 7th Overall Critérium International
 8th Clásica de San Sebastián
1996
 1st  Overall Tour of Austria
1st Prologue, Stages 3, 6 & 8
 1st  Overall Tour Méditerranéen
1st Stage 5
 1st GP Ouest–France
 1st Scheldeprijs
 1st Binche-Tournai-Binche
 1st Trofeo Laigueglia
 Tour de Wallonie
1st Prologue, Stages 2 (ITT) & 5
 2nd Grand Prix de Fourmies
 4th Overall Paris–Nice
 4th Overall Critérium International
 5th Coppa Ugo Agostoni
 7th Züri-Metzgete
1997
 1st  Overall Tour de Luxembourg
1st Stage 4 (ITT)
 1st Rund um Köln
 1st Trofeo Matteotti
 2nd Overall Tour of Austria
1st Stages 2, 4 & 8
 2nd Overall Four Days of Dunkirk
1998
 1st  Overall Paris–Nice
1st Stages 1 (ITT) & 5
 1st  Overall Tour de la Region Wallone
1st Stages 3 (ITT) & 6
 1st  Overall Tour of Galicia
1st Stage 4
 1st Gent–Wevelgem
 1st Prueba Villafranca de Ordizia
 2nd La Flèche Wallonne
 2nd Züri-Metzgete
 2nd Kuurne–Brussels–Kuurne
 2nd Grand Prix Eddy Merckx (with Nico Mattan)
 3rd Boucles de l'Aulne
 4th Overall Vuelta a Andalucía
 6th Liège–Bastogne–Liège
1999
 1st Liège–Bastogne–Liège
 1st Omloop Het Volk
 1st Grand Prix d'Ouverture La Marseillaise
 Vuelta a España
1st  Points classification
1st Stages 16 & 19
 1st Stage 4 Vuelta a Andalucía
 2nd Overall Three Days of De Panne
1st Stage 3b (ITT)
 2nd Tour of Flanders
 3rd E3 Prijs Vlaanderen
 4th Overall Paris–Nice
1st Stage 7
 5th Dwars door Vlaanderen
 7th Road race, UCI Road World Championships
 7th Paris–Roubaix
 9th GP Ouest–France
2000
 2nd Road race, National Road Championships
 6th Overall Étoile de Bessèges
1st Stage 3b (TTT)
 7th Overall Vuelta a Andalucía
2002
 4th Overall Tour de Pologne
2003
 2nd Tour of Flanders
 4th Omloop Het Volk
 8th Overall Tour of Belgium
 9th Dwars door Vlaanderen 
2004
 6th Overall Paris–Nice
 6th Overall Tour of Qatar
 7th La Flèche Wallonne
 8th Overall Setmana Catalana de Ciclisme
2005
 3rd Time trial, National Road Championships
2009
 3rd Overall Boucle de l'Artois
1st Stage 2 (ITT)

Grand Tour general classification results timeline

See also
 List of doping cases in cycling

Notes

References

External links

 
 Frank Vandenbroucke – Daily Telegraph obituary
 Alan Hope, "Death of a hard rider" and Leo Cendrowicz, "Brilliant but troubled: Vandenbroucke's stormy career" – articles in Flanders Today
 VDB4-ever – Frank Vandenbroucke Memorial Site

1974 births
2009 deaths
People from Mouscron
Belgian male cyclists
Doping cases in cycling
Belgian Vuelta a España stage winners
Cyclists at the 1996 Summer Olympics
Olympic cyclists of Belgium
Walloon people
Walloon sportspeople
Belgian sportspeople in doping cases
Deaths from pulmonary embolism
Cyclists from Hainaut (province)